The Gingerbread Man (also known as The Gingerbread Boy) is a fairy tale about a gingerbread man's escape from various pursuers until his eventual demise between the jaws of a fox. 
"The Gingerbread Boy" first appeared in print in the May 1875, issue of St. Nicholas Magazine in a cumulative tale which, like "The Little Red Hen," depends on repetitious scenes featuring an ever-growing cast of characters for its effect. According to the reteller of the tale, "A girl from Maine told it to my children. It interested them so much that I thought it worth preserving. I asked where she found it and she said an old lady told it to her in her childhood."

1875 story 
In the 1875 St. Nicholas tale, a childless old woman bakes a gingerbread man, who leaps from her oven and runs away. The woman and her husband give chase, but are unable to catch him. The gingerbread man then outruns several farm workers, farm men, and farm animals. 

 I've run away from a little old woman, 
 A little old man,
 And I can run away from you, I can!
The tale ends with a fox catching and eating the gingerbread man who cries as he is devoured, "I'm quarter gone...I'm half gone...I'm three-quarters gone...I'm all gone!"

Variations on the 1875 story
The Gingerbread Man remains a common subject for American children's literature into the 21st century. The retellings often omit the original ending ("I am quarter gone... I am half gone... I am three-quarters gone... I am all gone!") and make other changes. In some variations, the fox feigns deafness, drawing the Gingerbread Man closer and closer. Then the fox snatches and devours him. In other versions, the Gingerbread Man halts in his flight at a riverbank, and after accepting the fox's offer to ferry him across, is convinced by the fox to move ever-forward toward the fox's mouth.

In some retellings, the Gingerbread Man taunts his pursuers with the famous line: 
 Run, run as fast as you can!
 You can't catch me.
 I'm the Gingerbread Man!

Folk tales
The character of the runaway food exists in folktales. Folklorist D. L. Ashliman located it across Germany, the British Isles, and Eastern Europe, as well as the United States. Jack Haney also located it in Slavdom and in Northern Europe.

In Slavic lands, a traditional character known as Kolobok is a ball of bread dough who avoids being eaten by various animals (collected by Konstantin Ushinsky in Native Word (Rodnoye slovo) in 1864). "The Pancake" ("Pannekaken") was collected by Peter Asbjornsen and Jørgen Moe and published in Norske Folkeeventyr (1842-1844), and, ten years later, the German brothers Carl and Theodor Colshorn collected "The Big, Fat Pancake" ("Vom dicken fetten Pfannekuchen") from the Salzdahlum region and published the tale in Märchen und Sagen, no. 57, (1854). In 1894, Karl Gander collected "The Runaway Pancake" ("Der fortgelaufene Eierkuchen") from an Ögeln cottager and peddler and published the tale in Niederlausitzer Volkssagen, vornehmlich aus dem Stadt- und Landkreise Guben, no. 319. The Roule Galette story is a similar story from France.

A variation of this trope is found in the Hungarian tale "The Little Dumpling" ("A kis gömböc"), and contrary to the title the main character is not a dumpling, but the Hungarian version of head cheese (which is referred to as "gömböc" - "dumpling" - in some regions of Hungary). In the tale it is the gömböc that eats the others; it first consumes the family that "made" it, and then, rolling on the road, it eats various others – including a whole army – the last of whom is a swineherd. His knife opens the gömböc from the inside, and the people run home. In another variation the gömböc bursts after eating too many people. A similar Russian tale is called "The Clay-Boy" ("Гли́няный па́рень", Glínyanyĭ párenʹ). In it, an old childless couple make themselves a clay-child, who first eats all their food, then them, then a number of people, until he meets a goat who offers to jump right into his mouth, but instead uses the opportunity to ram the Clay-Boy, shattering him and freeing everyone. The Czech folk tale Otesánek (and the 2000 movie with the same name) follows a similar plot.

Joseph Jacobs published "Johnny-Cake" in his English Fairy Tales (1890), basing his tale on a version found in the American Journal of Folk-Lore. Jacobs' johnny-cake rolls rather than runs, and the fox tricks him by pretending to be deaf and unable to hear his taunting verse. In "The Wee Bannock" from More English Fairy Tales (1894), Jacobs records a Scottish tale with a bannock as hero.

Derivations and modern works
The musical The Gingerbread Man (music by Alfred Baldwin Sloane, book and lyrics by Frederic G. Ranken) opened on Broadway on Christmas Day 1905 and ran for five months. The massive production then moved to Chicago with most of its New York cast and continued a successful tour of smaller venues in the U.S. for at least another four years. In this show the titular character, a gingerbread man, is named John Dough ("John Dough" being another term for a gingerbread man that was current at the time). While the gingerbread man is not the main character, he was played by crowd favorite Eddie Redway and caught the attention of audiences and critics. The gingerbread man idea was also heavily promoted by the producers: 25,000 dough statuettes were given away in New York City to promote the show. This John Dough had few resemblances to the Gingerbread Man of the 1875 story described above. He claims to be a scapegoat rather than a troublemaker: "They are looking for me high and low, I'm wanted for that, I'm wanted for this, For any old thing that has gone amiss." Ranken's John Dough gingerbread man has few qualms about being eaten; he seems to fear obscurity more: "A little boy buys me with a cent . . . And removes an arm or leg or two, As down his throat I gently float, How can that hopeful know, Unless he is told, That he's stowed in his hold, The original John Dough."

L. Frank Baum's John Dough and the Cherub (1906) and The Road to Oz (1909) also feature a gingerbread man named John Dough. Baum's John Dough is a life-sized creation and scared of being eaten, but he ultimately sacrifices his hand to save a child's life. The Baum 1906 story also helped popularize the meme of the Gingerbread Man, although Baum's tale, like Ranken's, contained few elements of the original story.

Some tales have settings and cultural connections beyond Europe, such as Eric Kimmel's The Runaway Tortilla (2000) about a desert-roving tortilla who avoids donkeys, rattlesnakes, and buckaroos only to be defeated by crafty Señor Coyote; the Hanukkah version called The Runaway Latkes (2000) by Leslie Kimmelman; and Ying Chang Compestine's Chinese New Year tale, The Runaway Rice Cake (2001). Peter Armour's Stop That Pickle! (2005) is a tale about a runaway deli pickle. Marsupial Sue Presents "The Runaway Pancake" follows a similar plotline about a pancake whose hubris gets the best of him.

Modern twists on the tale that retain a gingerbread man as the protagonist include Janet Squires' The Gingerbread Cowboy, The Gingerbread Kid Goes to School (2002) by Joan Holub, and Lisa Campbell's The Gingerbread Girl (2006). In 1992 Jon Sciezka published The Stinky Cheese Man and Other Fairly Stupid Tales. "The Stinky Cheese Man" is a rendition of "The Gingerbread Man" where the stinky cheese man runs away from everyone fearing that they will eat him, when really everyone just wants to get away from his smell. In 2018, Stephen Dixon published a sequel entitled The Gingerbread Man 2: What Happened Later?. The Gingerbread Baby by Jan Brett is a version of the tale where the gingerbread man escapes from the fox and goes on to live in a gingerbread house.

The tale was used by The Residents in their 1994 album Gingerbread Man. Here, the gingerbread man serves as the narrator, introducing the characters in each song.

The Korean mobile game series Cookie Run is inspired by this fairy tale. The British video game Ninjabread Man also features a sentient Gingerbread Man.

The Gingerbread Man is a dangerous criminal in the Jasper Fforde Nursery Crimes series and the main antagonist in the second novel in this series, The Fourth Bear.

The book "The Hypnotizer" by Michael Rosen includes a story, which was also published on YouTube in 2008, called "fast food," which follows a similar plot but with a hamburger replacing the gingerbread man.

A happy-ending Gingerbread Man book "The True Story of the Gingerbread Man" was published in 2019 by Allen Kitchen with illustrations by Funda Girgin.

The Gingerbread Man is notably parodied throughout the Shrek franchise, where he is a recurring character voiced by Conrad Vernon.

American rapper Nardo Wick sampled The Gingerbread Man song in his song Dah Dah DahDah from the deluxe version of the debut studio album, Who Is Nardo Wick?.

References

External links

Facsimile of 1875 story "The Gingerbread Boy"

1875 books
European fairy tales
Literary characters introduced in 1875
Fictional food characters
Fictional foxes
Fictional humanoids
Ginger
Male characters in fairy tales
Works originally published in St. Nicholas Magazine
ATU 2000-2199